The 22nd Filmfare Awards were held in 1975. 

Roti Kapda Aur Makaan led the ceremony with 11 nominations, followed by Kora Kagaz with 7 nominations and Garm Hava with 5 nominations.

Garm Hava and Roti Kapda Aur Makaan won 3 awards each,  thus becoming the most-awarded films at the ceremony, with the former winning Best Story (Ismat Chughtai & Kaifi Azmi), Best Screenplay (Shama Zaidi & Kaifi Azmi) and Best Dialogue (Kaifi Azmi), and the latter winning Best Director (Manoj Kumar), Best Lyricist (Santosh Anand for "Main Na Bhoolunga") and Best Male Playback Singer (Mahendra Kapoor for "Aur Nahin Bas Aur Nahin").

Rajesh Khanna received dual nominations for Best Actor for his performances in Avishkaar and Prem Nagar, winning for the former.

Hema Malini received dual nominations for Best Actress for her performances in Amir Garib and Prem Nagar, but lost to Jaya Bachchan who won the award for Kora Kagaz.

Premnath received dual nominations for Best Supporting Actor for his performances in Amir Garib and Roti Kapda Aur Makaan, but lost to Vinod Khanna who won the award for Haath Ki Safai.

Bindu received dual nominations for Best Supporting Actress for her performances in Hawas and Imtihan, but lost to Durga Khote who won the award for Bidaai.

Main Awards

Best Film
 Rajnigandha 
Ankur 
Garm Hava
Kora Kagaz
Roti Kapda Aur Makaan

Best Director
 Manoj Kumar – Roti Kapda Aur Makaan 
Anil Ganguly – Kora Kagaz
Basu Bhattacharya – Avishkaar
M.S. Sathyu – Garm Hava
Shyam Benegal – Ankur

Best Actor in a Leading Role
 Rajesh Khanna – Avishkaar 
Dharmendra – Resham Ki Dori
Dilip Kumar – Sagina
Manoj Kumar – Roti Kapda Aur Makaan
Rajesh Khanna – Prem Nagar

Best Actress in a Leading Role
 Jaya Bachchan – Kora Kagaz 
Hema Malini – Amir Garib 
Hema Malini – Prem Nagar
Saira Banu – Sagina
Shabana Azmi – Ankur

Best Actor in a Supporting Role
 Vinod Khanna – Haath Ki Safai 
Feroz Khan – International Crook
Premnath – Amir Garib
Premnath – Roti Kapda Aur Makaan
Shatrughan Sinha – Dost

Best Actress in a Supporting Role
 Durga Khote – Bidaai 
Bindu – Hawas
Bindu – Imtihan
Jayshree T. – Resham Ki Dori
Moushumi Chatterjee – Roti Kapda Aur Makaan

Best Actor in a Comic Role
 Mehmood – Vardaan 
Asrani – Bidaai
Asrani – Chor Machaye Shor
Mehmood – Duniya Ka Mela
Mehmood – Kunwara Baap

Best Art Direction
 Sagina – Sudhendu Roy

Best Cinematography
 Prem Nagar – A. Vincent

Best Dialogue
 Garm Hava – Kaifi Azmi

Best Editing
 Roti – Kamlakar Karkhanis

Best Music Director 
 Kora Kagaz – Kalyanji-Anandji 
Aap Ki Kasam – R.D. Burman
Prem Nagar – S.D. Burman
Resham Ki Dori – Shankar-Jaikishan
Roti Kapda Aur Makaan – Laxmikant Pyarelal

Best Lyricist
 Roti Kapda Aur Makaan – Santosh Anand for Main Na Bhoolunga 
Dost – Anand Bakshi for Gaadi Bula Rahi Hai
Kora Kagaz – M.G. Hashmat for Mera Jeevan Kora Kagaz
Resham Ki Dori – Indeevar for Behna Ne Bhai Ki Kalai
Roti Kapda Aur Makaan – Santosh Anand for Aur Nahin Bas Aur Nahin

Best Playback Singer, Male
 Roti Kapda Aur Makaan – Mahendra Kapoor for Aur Nahin Bas Aur Nahin 
Dost – Kishore Kumar for Gaadi Bula Rahi Hai
Kora Kagaz – Kishore Kumar for Mera Jeevan Kora Kagaz
Maa, Behen Aur Biwi – Mohammad Rafi for Accha Hi Hua
Roti Kapda Aur Makaan – Mukesh for Main Na Bhoolunga

Best Playback Singer, Female
 Pran Jaye Per Vachan Na Jaye – Asha Bhosle for Chain Se Hum Ko 
Bidaai – Asha Bhosle for Acche Samay Pe
Hawas – Asha Bhosle for Yeh Hawas Hai
Manoranjan – Asha Bhosle for Chori Chori
Resham Ki Dori – Suman Kalyanpur for Behna Ne Bhai Ki Kalai

Best Screenplay
 Garm Hava – Shama Zaidi & Kaifi Azmi

Best Story
 Garm Hava – Ismat Chugtai & Kaifi Azmi
Ankur – Shyam Benegal
Bidaai – N.T. Rama Rao
Kora Kagaz – Ashutosh Mukhopadhyay
Roti Kapda Aur Makaan – Manoj Kumar

Best Sound
 Amir Garib – L. H. Bhatia

Critics' Awards

Best Film
 Rajnigandha

Best Documentary
 The Nomad Puppeteer

Biggest Winners
 Garm Hava – 3/5
 Roti Kapda Aur Makaan – 3/11
 Rajnigandha – 2/2
 Kora Kagaz – 2/7

See also
 24th Filmfare Awards
 23rd Filmfare Awards
 Filmfare Awards

References

 https://www.imdb.com/event/ev0000245/1975/

Filmfare Awards
Filmfare
1975 in Indian cinema